Roberto Torres (born 29 August 1964) is a Spanish former professional racing cyclist. He rode in one edition of the Tour de France, one edition of the Giro d'Italia and nine editions of the Vuelta a España.

Major results

1987
2nd Overall Vuelta a los Valles Mineros
1989
2nd Overall Vuelta a Aragón
1st Stage 4
1990
1st Overall Tour d'Armorique
1st Stage 2
1st Stage 3a ITT Route du Sud
1991
1st Stage 2 Volta ao Alentejo
6th Overall GP du Midi-Libre
1992
1st Stage 13 Vuelta a España
1993
1st Stage 5a Vuelta a la Comunidad Valenciana

References

External links
 

1964 births
Living people
Spanish male cyclists
Sportspeople from Montpellier
Cyclists from Occitania (administrative region)
People from Móstoles
Cyclists from the Community of Madrid
French people of Spanish descent
French emigrants to Spain
Spanish Vuelta a España stage winners